Tegula ignota is a species of sea snail, a marine gastropod mollusk in the family Tegulidae.

Description
The size of the shell attains 35 mm.

Distribution
This species occurs in the Pacific Ocean off Chile.

References

 Ramírez-Böhme J. (1976) Nueva especie de Trochidae: Tegula ignota n. sp. (Gastropoda, Monodontinae).Museo Nacional de Historia Natural [Santiago, Chile], Noticiario Mensual 20(237-238): 3-5

External links
 To World Register of Marine Species
 

ignota
Gastropods described in 1976
Endemic fauna of Chile